Peter Donato, is a marathon runner from Toronto, Canada. Running in the costume of Jefferson, the mascot dog of MyNextRace.com, he obtained the record for the fastest marathon run by a male wearing a mascot costume when finished the Scotiabank Toronto Waterfront Marathon in 4 hours 16 minutes 43 seconds on September 26, 2010.  This record was covered here by the CBC, Toronto Star here and Runners Web here.

He also held the Guinness World Record for half-marathon run by a male in a mascot costume. He achieved this during the Publix Supermarkets Gasparilla Distance Classic in Tampa, FL, U.S.A. on February 27, 2011. Running in the Jefferson costume, he completed the Half-Marathon in 1hr 59min 14sec.  This new record was covered by Irun Magazine in Canada here and the Tampa Times here.  This half-marathon record was then broken by the Brand Manager of MyNextRace.com, David Hiddleston, on October 13, 2011 which you can read here at the same race, the Toronto Waterfront Marathon in 1 hour, 46 minutes, 27 seconds.

The costume weighs 25 pounds. MyNextRace.com is a website maintained by All Sports Marketing Inc., a company founded by Donato which specializes in marketing and management of sporting events. Donato was also quoted in the Globe and Mail for his efforts to revive MyNextRace.com in 2012 and this article is found here.  One of the biggest fans of MyNextRace.com and a personal friend and sponsored athlete, Danny Kassap died due to heart problems discovered after pulling out of the Sporting Life 10k race.  Peter Donato was quoted in this Toronto Star article here.

MyNextRace.com created the first ever Midnight Run in Canada on December 31 in Liberty Village, Toronto, as featured here and covered extensively by various media outlets over the years including many Top Ten lists at Toronto Life here and here.  Peter Donato was quoted as a "local legend" in the Toronto Star here.  Good Times Running took over the event and added the largest halloween fitness experience called Monster Dash Toronto to the lineup as featured numerous times here on CP24 and here.  Local media outlets have covered this popular event including the Simcoe News here.
In 2020 after the global COVID-19 pandemic shut down the Events Industry Mr. Donato started a fundraiser for health care workers which has raised over $30,000 to date.  The Isolation Run attracted participants from across Canada and was featured in the Globe and Mail article here and Niagara This Week here when Donato raised money himself and cycled 273 kilometres throughout the Niagara region as a personal challenge.

References

Canadian male marathon runners
Living people
Year of birth missing (living people)